"Where in the World" is a single by British band Swing Out Sister. It was the second single off the second studio album, Kaleidoscope World and was slightly edited for release. The song "The Windmills of Your Mind" was recorded live for The Jeff Graham Show, courtesy of Radio Luxembourg.

Track listings 
UK CD Single
 "Where In The World"
 "Taxi Town"
 "Windmills of Your Mind"  
 "Breakout" (A New Rockin' Version)
UK 7" Single
 "Where In The World"
 "Taxi Town"
UK 10" Single
 "Where In The World" (Bongo Fury Mix)
 "Where In The World"
 "Windmills of Your Mind"
UK 12" Single
 "Where In The World" (Radical Mix)
 "Where In The World"
 "Taxi Town"
 "Windmills of Your Mind"

Weekly charts

References

Swing Out Sister songs
1989 singles
1989 songs
Fontana Records singles